Paolo Nicolai (born 8 June 1988) is an Italian beach volleyball player.

Biography
Nicolai was born in Ortona, province of Chieti. In 2007 and 2008, he won the FIVB Youth Beach Volleyball World Championships (with Francesco Giontella). 

From 2009 he played with different partners (Matteo Varnier and Matteo Martino), becoming an Italian champion once, until in 2011 the Italian federation had him partnered with Daniele Lupo. Lupo and Nicolai qualified for the 2012 Olympic Games, where they were eliminated by the Dutch team Nummerdor-Schuil in the quarter-finals. Nicolai was elected FIVB Most Improved Player 2012.

Lupo and Nicolai won the Beach Volleyball European World Championships twice, once in 2014 and again in 2016. A series of podiums in the World Tour also granted them the qualification for the 2016 Summer Olympics, where they reached the final, winning the silver medal.  They reached the final, despite having to qualify as "lucky losers" from the pool stage.

References

External links

1988 births
Living people
Italian beach volleyball players
Beach volleyball blockers
Beach volleyball players at the 2012 Summer Olympics
Olympic beach volleyball players of Italy
Beach volleyball players at the 2016 Summer Olympics
Olympic silver medalists for Italy
Medalists at the 2016 Summer Olympics
Olympic medalists in beach volleyball
People from Ortona
Beach volleyball players at the 2020 Summer Olympics
Sportspeople from the Province of Chieti
21st-century Italian people